Maratus sapphirus is a species of peacock spider. The spider is endemic to the south coast of New South Wales, Australia. It was first described in 2017 after a specimen was found at the Murrah Flora Reserve.

References

Salticidae
Spiders of Australia
Spiders described in 2017